This is a chronological list of classical music composers living or working in England or originating from there. Entries are alphabetical within each year.

Medieval

Renaissance

Baroque

Classical era

Romantic

Modern

Contemporary

See also
Classical music of the United Kingdom

References

English